Munida abelloi is a species of squat lobster in the family Munididae. The species name is dedicated to Pere Abellô.

References

Squat lobsters
Crustaceans described in 1994